The 2017 General Aung San Shield is the third season of Myanmar knockout football competition. The tournament is organized by the Myanmar Football Federation. It is the league cup competition started in 2017 Myanmar football season. This cup succeeded the Myanmar Football Federation Cup. MFF has changed the cup competition style as follows.

In the first round, ten clubs competing in 2017 MNL-2 and two clubs which were promoted to 2017 MNL, twelve teams in total, will be involved playing at a neutral ground with six teams emerged as winners. In the second round, ten clubs competing in 2016 MNL and the six winners from the first round, sixteen teams in total, will be involved playing at a neutral ground with eight teams emerged as winners. The Quarter-finals will still be played as one-legged matches but the Semi-final will be competed as two-legged (Home and Away) matches.

The cup winner is guaranteed a place in the 2018 AFC Cup.

Prize fund

Results

Preliminary round
Preliminary round consists of two rounds for teams currently playing in the Regional League Division 1 level. The First round was held 24 April 2017.

First round

Second round

Quarterfinal

Semifinal

First leg

Second leg

Final

Top goalscorers

Sponsor

Official Main Sponsor
 Myanmar Brewery Ltd

Official Partner
 AYA Bank

Media Broadcasting
 MWD

Co-sponsor
 AYA Myanmar Insurance
 M-150
 Thanlwin Private School
 Sumitomo Electric

References

General Aung San Shield
2017 in Burmese football
2017 domestic association football cups